Grand Prix Legends is a computer racing simulator developed by Papyrus Design Group and published in 1998 by Sierra On-Line under the Sierra Sports banner. It simulates the 1967 Grand Prix season.

Gameplay
The game offers several modes in which the player can race alone or against AI opponents. The game also features multiplayer via LAN. Many parameters affecting the skill and aggressiveness of the AI drivers can be specified.

Development
The game was in development for three years with a team of 25 to 30 people. Inspired by the 1966 film Grand Prix, the developers chose to base the game on the 1967 Formula 1 Grand Prix season because during that period tracks were narrow and lined with trees, houses, and other elements that in a video game can serve as backgrounds to enhance the sensation of speed. In addition, the more primitive suspension of cars of the time meant that the car physics could be more visually dramatic.

However, the amount of time that has passed since the 1967 Grand Prix season meant that some of the tracks the designers wanted to recreate no longer existed in their original form. The team visited town halls to get blueprints for defunct tracks. Licensing could also be difficult. Papyrus co-founder Dave Kaemmer commented, "It's not a pleasant thing to call someone on the phone and say that you want to license their dead son's name, but people have been very helpful."

Reception

Critical reception

The game received "favorable" reviews according to the review aggregation website GameRankings. GameSpot said, "Grand Prix Legends will reward you with arguably the most intense racing experience ever seen on a personal computer." Next Generation said of the game in its January 1999 issue, "Overall, there aren't enough adjectives to describe how excellent this is. If you're willing to make the investment it takes to become good, you'll be rewarded with what is perhaps the most exciting and engaging racing game we've ever had the privilege to play." An issue later, the magazine ranked it at #47 in its list of the Fifty Best Games of All Time, saying, "Not only does it have the most realistic physics model yet in a racing game [...] a brilliant premise, and the best drive AI we've seen, but GPL enables players to do something they simply never could in the real world. Many, if not most[,] games do that, but few do it as convincingly or compellingly."

Sales
The game was a commercial failure; Andy Mahood of PC Gamer US described its sales as "abysmally poor". In 2003, writer Mark H. Walker reported that "the game sold only a few thousand copies" in the United States, which he attributed to the general unpopularity of Formula One racing in the country. He noted that its "steep learning curve kept many fans away" in European markets. GameSpots Gord Goble attributed its performance to the "combination of treacherous gameplay, sometimes glacial frame rates, and esoteric subject matter". It ultimately totaled 200,000 sales by 2004.

Awards
The game was the runner-up for Computer Gaming Worlds 1998 "Best Driving" award, and for GameSpots 1998 "Driving Game of the Year" award, both of which ultimately went to Need for Speed III: Hot Pursuit. The staff of the former said of the game, "Arguably the most ambitious and realistic driving simulation to date—modeling the thrills and difficulties of Grand Prix racing circa 1967—it is also perhaps the toughest to play. It's an awesome game for those who can handle it."

The game won Computer Games Strategy Plus 1998 "Sports Game of the Year" award. The staff wrote, "Racing games are always popular, and there are a lot of them, but few if any approach Grand Prix Racings level of sophistication and uncompromising detail." It also won the Best Racing Game award at the 1998 CNET Gamecenter Awards.

Legacy

References

External links
 

1998 video games
Formula One video games
Sierra Entertainment games
Video games set in Canada
Video games set in Belgium
Video games set in France
Video games set in Germany
Video games set in Italy
Video games set in Mexico
Video games set in Monaco
Video games set in the Netherlands
Video games set in South Africa
Video games set in the United Kingdom
Video games set in the United States
Racing simulators
Windows games
Windows-only games
Racing video games
Papyrus Design Group games
Video games developed in the United States
Multiplayer and single-player video games